Lisa Izquierdo (born 29 August 1994) is a German female volleyball player, playing as a right side hitter. She is part of the Germany women's national volleyball team. She competed at the 2013 Women's European Volleyball Championship. On club level she played for Dresdner SC.

References

1989 births
Living people
German women's volleyball players
People from Staßfurt
German people of Cuban descent
Sportspeople from Saxony-Anhalt
21st-century German women
20th-century German women